Alfred is a village located in the town of Alfred in Allegany County, New York, United States. The population was 4,174 at the 2010 census. The village lies in the north-central part of the town of Alfred on the eastern edge of Allegany County. It is named after Alfred the Great.

Alfred is located in the hills of western New York along the Southern Tier. The layout of the valley is such that the lowest part contains the village, and upon the hills to the east and west are Alfred University and Alfred State College, respectively. The valley was originally called Kanakadea (or Canakadea, or other spellings) by Native Americans. Local folklore states that Kanakadea means "where the earth meets the sky".

Alfred is located in the 607 (telephone) area code, 14802 zip (postal) code, and is in the second poorest county in the state (Allegany). The closest cities are Hornell and Olean.

The hills greatly affect the weather in the region, which results in quick changes as well as different conditions in neighboring valleys.

The village hosts the annual Hot Dog Day festival (early April).

The village is home to one of the largest optical telescopes in New York state, at the Stull Observatory at Alfred University.  Alfred State College is also located in the village.

History 
The village was first settled circa 1807 and was incorporated in 1881. The village was previously called "Alfred Centre".

The following are listed on the National Register of Historic Places: Alfred Village Historic District, Alumni Hall, Fireman's Hall, Allen Steinheim Museum and the Terra Cotta Building.

Geography
Alfred is approximately located at 42.3° north latitude, 77.8° west longitude.

A small stream, Kanakadea Creek, flows through the center of the village, then to the Canisteo River, part of the Susquehanna River watershed. The topography is steep hill country, part of the Allegheny Plateau, a physiographic region that is part of the Appalachian Mountains.

Demographics

As of the census of 2000, there were 3,954 people, 530 households, and 169 families residing in the village. The population density was 3,352.5 people per square mile (1,293.8/km). There were 576 housing units at an average density of 488.4 per square mile (188.5/km). The racial makeup of the village was 90.21% White, 4.40% Black or African American, 0.33% Native American, 2.71% Asian, 0.03% Pacific Islander, 1.21% from other races, and 1.11% from two or more races. Hispanic or Latino of any race were 2.73% of the population.

There were 530 households, out of which 12.3% had children under the age of 18 living with them, 26.0% were married couples living together, 4.2% had a female householder with no husband present, and 68.1% were non-families. 38.9% of all households were made up of individuals, and 10.6% had someone living alone who was 65 years of age or older. The average household size was 2.05 and the average family size was 2.73.

In the village, the population was spread out, with 3.0% under the age of 18, 83.1% from 18 to 24, 5.9% from 25 to 44, 4.6% from 45 to 64, and 3.3% who were 65 years of age or older. The median age was 20 years. For every 100 females, there were 144.8 males. For every 100 females age 18 and over, there were 147.2 males.

The median income for a household in the village was $21,313, and the median income for a family was $70,694. Males had a median income of $15,750 versus $39,375 for females. The per capita income for the village was $8,224. About 2.0% of families and 37.7% of the population were below the poverty line, including none of those under age 18 and 2.8% of those age 65 or over.

References

External links

  Village of Alfred official website

Villages in New York (state)
Villages in Allegany County, New York